Ukhwi is a village in the Kalahari desert of Kgalagadi District, western Botswana,  from the border with Namibia. The population was 459 in 2011 census.
Although English is the official language of Botswana, numerous other languages are spoken in the area: Afrikaans, Tswana, Nama, and !Xóõ.

References

Villages in Botswana
Kgalagadi District